Freeman Wright Holmes (6 June 1871–21 February 1967) was a New Zealand jockey, horse driver, trainer and breeder. He was born in Ashburton, South Canterbury, New Zealand on 6 June 1871.

See also

 Harness racing in New Zealand

References

1871 births
1967 deaths
New Zealand jockeys
New Zealand racehorse owners and breeders
Sportspeople from Ashburton, New Zealand